Eva Luna is a 2010 telenovela produced by Venevisión International in collaboration with Univision Studios, starring Blanca Soto and Guy Ecker as the main protagonists, and Julian Gil and Susana Dosamantes as the main antagonists. It is a remake of Telemundo's 1997 telenovela Aguamarina. Univision aired Eva Luna weeknights at 8pm/7pm central from November 1, 2010 to April 11, 2011, and a TV-14 rating was applied for all episodes. Mexico's Canal de las Estrellas aired Eva Luna from September 19, 2011 to January 6, 2012.

Synopsis 
A love story set in Los Angeles, Eva Luna revolves around the life of Eva González (Blanca Soto), a young woman of extraordinary beauty, humble and hardworking. Like so many immigrants coming to America, Eva arrives with her father and younger sister to California in search of a better life. However, Eva does not imagine that to find happiness will first have to suffer a terrible loss, because her life is intertwined with dark family secrets, lies, deception and ambition of a powerful family.

Eva finds work as a personal attendant to the founder of Publicidad Arismendi, Julio Arismendi. She immediately wins over his son, Leonardo Arismendi (Julian Gil), and his best friend, Daniel Villanueva (Guy Ecker), who is dating Leonardo's sister, Victoria (Vanessa Villela). Victoria and her mother, Marcela (Susana Dosamantes), dislike Eva, as they feel that Eva threatens Victoria's beauty. Daniel is a successful advertising executive of Publicidad Arismendi and widowed father of a young daughter named Laurita (Gaby Borges). Daniel & Eva are immediately attracted to each other. At first, the relationship between Daniel and Eva is a disastrous swing of love and hate, but in the end they fall madly, passionately in love. When Daniel leaves Victoria for Eva, Marcela takes action. She gives Victoria a cup of tea and has her go to sleep. Renata, their housekeeper, is sent to check on Victoria, and calls 911 when she sees Victoria won't answer and has pills next to her bedside, that Marcela put there on purpose. Awaking in the hospital, Victoria is told by her mother that she attempted to commit suicide, although Victoria herself has no memory or thought of committing suicide. Marcela explains that she must play the part of the heartbroken suicidal victim in order to trick Daniel to come back to her, but Daniel will not be manipulated by the two women anymore.

Marcela Arismendi is a cold woman. Her first husband was El Gallo – Leonardo's father, a fact that only she knew. She later married Julio and adopted Victoria. Marcela was more interested in Julio's wealth and power in society than anything else. She has been slowly poisoning him to an early death, so that she can be the only owner of the multimillion dollar company she and Julio created. She sent orders to kill Daniel's parents and his wife, so that Victoria, could marry Daniel and Marcela would have complete control over her associate. Slowly, Julio begins to see patterns in his life. The few days that Eva stopped coming to take care of him, he refused to take his medicine, and he actually felt healthier. When Eva returned, his medicine was again given to him, forcing him to stop testing his hypothesis. However, as months pass and Eva gets fired again, he throws his coffee with the medicine on the ground, and his faithful loving dog, Max, licks it off the ground.

The day of Eva and Daniel's secret, private wedding, Eva recalls what she has gone through to get to the love of her life. She lost her father to a hit and run accident, and Leonardo makes her believe that Daniel was the mysterious man behind the wheel that did not stop to help, when it was actually Leonardo borrowing Daniel's car. Devastated by learning that her future husband murdered her father, she swears revenge and Leonardo takes the opportunity to separate her from Daniel. Meanwhile, Marcela and Victoria plot to make Daniel hate Eva. Victoria sends Eva to pick up a check at the bank, saying it's for herself, when really it's in Eva's name, with $25,000 from Daniel's professional bank account. Eva unknowingly takes the check, and returns it to Victoria. Marcela breaks the "news" to Daniel on his would-be wedding day, after Eva stood him up, he refuses to believe that Eva would steal from him, until he sees the pictures. Eva, meanwhile has turned catatonic, and will not leave her bed. Two days later, she runs away with Leonardo to his country home, where she hides from the police, after Daniel and Marcela have signed a warrant for her arrest.

After a series of unexpected events, Eva comes back with Daniel's child, and inherits the advertising agency where Daniel works, and returns to his life as his boss. Armed with a position of power and identity of the new moon, she puts her plan of revenge into action, but struggles between keeping the promise made at the tomb of her father or forgive Daniel. However, Daniel is not fooled by the new attitude of Eva, to find Leonardo's betrayal, decides to fight to prove his innocence and win her heart again.

Leonardo asks El Gallo to call Tony at a specific place, planning to kill him. He hires a man to shoot Tony, but Tony manages to escape unharmed. El Gallo had warned Leonardo not to kill Tony. El Gallo calls Leonardo at a warehouse and gives Tony the gun to kill him. Leonardo manages to escape, injuring Tony. Marcela kills El Gallo when he attempted to kill Leonardo, After Marcela instructs Leonardo to marry Eva, he leaves and tells El Gallo that he was the only man she loved but she couldn't allow him to kill his son.

On the day of Eva and Leonardo's wedding, Daniel is ready to stop the wedding by showing everyone a taped confession of Leonardo admitting to running over Eva's father. Eva personally stops the wedding and turns on Leonardo, accusing him of the crime. Victoria steps in and reveals that Leo hired Liliana to seduce Daniel in an attempt to keep him away from Eva and herself, caused Alicia to lose her baby with poison (the same way how Marcela caused Claudia to lose her baby), and confirmed that Leo killed Eva's father (after remembering that Leo claimed to have run over a tree). Leonardo attempts to kill Victoria, until Renata protects Victoria from injury and dies from being shot. Angered after the truth was revealed, policemen and detectives go after Leonardo after he holds Eva hostage as a way to kill her, and hurts Daniel by shooting him in the arm. Leo is then shot by detective Ravela and is run over by a car, instantly killing him.

Time passes by, and Eva and Daniel, reunited after a long time, prepare themselves to get married at last. Marcela returns after learning that her son has died "because of Eva". Marcela, previously arrested for murdering Daniel's parents and attempting to murder Julio, escaped from prison by killing the guards with El Gallo aiding her. She returns to the mansion and sets it on fire to kill Eva and Pablito. Marcela is unsuccessful, as Daniel comes in time to save Eva and their son. The mansion burns down, and Marcela is killed. Eva and Daniel finally get married, while Alicia and Tony kiss at the end.

Cast of characters 

Jorge Consejo as Jose Lozano.
Alberto Salaberri as Giorgio.
Verónica Montes as Maritza Ruiz.
Arnaldo Pipke as Damian.
Pau Gasol as Himself – Special guest.
Jenni Rivera – Special guest.
Eddie "Piolín" Sotelo
Carlos Cruz as Detective.
Carlos Pitela
Enrique Arredondo as Detective.
Gerardo Riveron as Lawyer.
Guadalupe Hernández
Hector Fuentes as Detective Reyes.
Jose Luis Tovar as Policeman.
Juan Carlos Baena as Lawyer.
Juan Cepero as Car dealer.
Juan Troya as David Basañez – Lawyer.
Omar Robau as Officer Rodriguez
Marcos Miranda as Dr. Marcos Garcia – Doctor.
Kary Musa as Rosaura
Marta Gonzalez as Lucy.
Mirta Renee as Vanessa.
Rafael Robledo as Detective.
Ramon Morell as Dr. Santiago Rivera.
Rayner Garranchan as Detective Morales.
Severino Puente as Judge.
Tely Ganas as Professor Rosales.
Carlos Yustis as Thomas Reyes.
Pau Gasol as himself

Music 

The soundtrack of the telenovela, titled "Eva Luna", was released on 1 January 2011.

Track listing

Awards

References

2010 telenovelas
Spanish-language American telenovelas
2010 American television series debuts
2011 American television series endings
Venevisión telenovelas
Univision telenovelas
2010 Venezuelan television series debuts
2011 Venezuelan television series endings
Television shows set in Miami